Katamon Medal (also Qatamon Medal) was an Israeli military decoration awarded during the 1947–1949 Palestine war for participation in the Battle of Katamon, part of Operation Yevusi.

History
The Katamon Medal was instituted in May 1948 as decoration to IDF soldiers who took part in the battle for the conquest of the Katamon neighborhood of Jerusalem, part of Operation Yevusi.

Awarding of the Katamon Medal began in July 1949, however soon after the awarding of the medal the IDF withdrew its recognition and wearing of the medal has stopped.

The Katamon Medal is a disk, 28 millimetres (1.10 inches) in diameter. The ribbon is attached to a loupe hole on the top of the medal. versions in both silver and bronze exist. 

 Obverse

The obverse shows in the centre the Tower of David and the Jewish Agency; around in Hebrew is writing from a Psalms verse "אם אשכחך ירושלים, תשכח ימיני" (Hebrew for If I forget thee O Jerusalem let my right hand be forgotten) 

 Reverse

The reverse reads "לכיבוש קטמון ירושלים כ"ב ניסן תש"ח" (Hebrew for for the conquest of Qatamon Jerusalem 22 Nissan 5708) and in English "1.5.1948"

 Ribbon

The ribbon is equal part blue and white.

References

Military awards and decorations of Israel